FC Anzhi-2 Makhachkala was a Russian football team from Makhachkala that played in the Russian Professional Football League. It previously played professionally from 1995 to 1997 and in the 2014–15 season, when it took over the spot of FC Dagdizel Kaspiysk. It was founded when FC Argo Kaspiysk team moved to Makhachkala in 1995. They were the farm club of FC Anzhi Makhachkala. When the parent club FC Anzhi was promoted back to the Russian Football Premier League (which hosted its own reserves team competition) after the 2014–15 season, Anzhi-2 was dissolved. It was re-created before the 2017–18 season. It was dissolved yet again after the season.

Team name and location history
 1995 FC Anzhi-2 Makhachkala
 1996 FC Anzhi-2 Kaspiysk
 1997 FC Anzhi-d Makhachkala
 1998–2000 FC Anzhi-2 Makhachkala
 2001–2002 played in the reserves team competition of Russian Premier League
 2003–2005 FC Anzhi-Khazar Makhachkala
 2006–2007 FC Anzhi-2 Makhachkala
 2014–2015 FC Anzhi-2 Makhachkala
 2017–2018 FC Anzhi-2 Makhachkala

References

External links
  Official Website

Association football clubs established in 1995
Association football clubs disestablished in 2018
Defunct football clubs in Russia
Sport in Makhachkala
1995 establishments in Russia
2018 disestablishments in Russia
FC Anzhi Makhachkala